is an electoral district of the Japanese House of Representatives, the lower house of the National Diet. The district was created as part of the move from mult-member districts to single-member districts in the House of Representatives.

Areas Covered

Current District 
As of 2 February 2023, the areas covered by this district are as follows:

 Niigata (city)
 Kita
 Akiha
 Shibata
 Murakami
 Gosen
 Agano
 Tainai
 Kitakanbara District
 Higashikanbara District
 Iwafune District

As part of the 2022 redistricting, Kita ward is now fully under the jurisdiction of the 3rd district, and Akiha Ward was gained from the 4th district.

Areas from 2013-2022 
From the first redistricting in 2013, until the second redistricting in 2022, the areas covered by this district were as follows:

 Niigata (city)
 Kita Ward (Former city of Toyosaka)
 Centra Government Office (excluding Hosoyama, Kosugi, Junimae and Yokogoshi)
 Sumireno 4 within North Branch Office jurisdiction.
 Shibata
 Murakami
 Gosen
 Agano
 Tainai
 Kitakanbara District
 Higashikanbara District
 Iwafune District

As part of the 2013 redistricting, the 3rd district gained sections of Kita Ward from the 1st district.

Areas from before 2013 
From the creation of the district in 1994, until the first redistricting in 2013, the areas covered bny this district were as follows:

 Shibata
 Murakami
 Gosen
 Toyosaka
 Kitakambara District
 Part of Nakakanbara District
 Muramatsu
Higashikanbara District
Iwafune District

History

Elected Representatives

Election Results 
‡ - Also ran in the Hokuriku Shinetsu PR election

‡‡ - Also ran and won in the Hokuriku Shinetsu PR election

Elections in the 2020s

Elections in the 2010s

Elections in the 2000s

Elections in the 1990s

References 

Districts of the House of Representatives (Japan)
Politics of Niigata Prefecture